Tarimoro is the municipal seat of the municipality of Tarimoro in the Mexican state of Guanajuato.

History 
The original settlement was a community of Otomi people who were later conquered by the Tarascós. The latter named this place Tarimoro, which means "Place of willows." The town was founded back in the epic of colonization by Don Lucas of San Juan on January 3, 1563. In 1910, its name was changed to Ciudad Obregon Gonzalez, by decree of the state Congress, in honor of the then state governor, Joaquin Gonzalez Obregon. However, the official name was later changed back to Tarimoro.

Geography and climate 
Tarimoro is located in Guanajuato. It is bordered to the north by Celaya, to the northwest by Apaseo del Alto, to the west by Jérecuaro, to the south by Acámbaro and to the west by Salvatierra.

It has 64 residents per square kilometer (166/square mile).

The most important localities of this town are La Noria de Gallegos, San Juan Bautista Cacalote, Panales de Jamaica, La Moncada, Galera de Panales and Acebuche.

Climate 
The weather is humid with rain in the summer. The average annual temperature is 19.9 °C (68 °F). The average annual rainfall reaches 700 millimeters. The maximum and minimum temperatures are 36 °C (97 °F) and 2 °C (36 °F).

Agriculture 
The main crops are corn, sorghum, and sweet potato. Of the 84 hectares (208 acres) sown during the agricultural year of 2000, 75.9% were temporary and 24.1% irrigation.

Livestock was recorded in the following figures:
Bovine 5,592
Pork 9,908
Sheep 1,249
Caprino 690

References

External links
Official site of Tarimoro Municipality

Populated places in Guanajuato
Populated places established in 1563
1563 establishments in New Spain